Grist Mill Bridge may refer to:

Grist Mill Bridge (Lebanon, Maine)
Grist Mill Bridge, Dam and Mill Site, Elsie, Michigan
Grist Mill Covered Bridge, Cambridge, Vermont